Englands Helicon is an anthology of Elizabethan pastoral poems compiled by John Flasket, and first published in 1600. There was an enlarged edition in 1614. The word Helicon refers to the Greek mountain on which, in Greek mythology, two springs sacred to the Muses were located.

The poets involved cannot all be identified, since there are a number of poems marked as 'anonymous'. The others were written by Edmund Bolton, William Byrd, Henry Chettle, Michael Drayton, Robert Greene, Christopher Marlowe, Anthony Munday, George Peele, Walter Raleigh, Henry Constable, William Shakespeare, Edward de Vere, Philip Sidney, Edmund Spenser, John Wootton, William Smith. The most celebrated poem is Marlowe's 'Come live with me and be my love'. This and several other lyrics have musical settings extant, in this case by William Corkine.

Poets of the anthology

External links
1925 reprint at Archive.org.
1899 edition with modernized spelling at Google Books.

1600 books
1614 books
English poetry anthologies
16th-century poetry books
17th-century poetry books